Sledge is a town located in Quitman County, Mississippi, United States. As of the 2020 census, the town had a total population of 368.

Geography 

Demographics

2020 census

Note: the US Census treats Hispanic/Latino as an ethnic category. This table excludes Latinos from the racial categories and assigns them to a separate category. Hispanics/Latinos can be of any race.

2000 Census
As of the census of 2000, there were 529 people, 170 households, and 133 families residing in the town. The population density was 1,011.3 people per square mile (392.8/km). There were 185 housing units at an average density of 353.7 per square mile (137.4/km). The racial makeup of the town was 23.25% White, 75.99% African American, 0.00% Native American, 0.00% Asian, 0.00% Pacific Islander, 0.00% from other races, and 0.76% from two or more races. Of the population, 1.13% were Hispanic or Latino of any race.

There were 170 households, out of which 38.2% had children under the age of 18 living with them, 43.5% were married couples living together, 29.4% had a female householder with no husband present, and 21.2% were non-families. Of all households, 20.0% were made up of individuals, and 9.4% had someone living alone who was 65 years of age or older. The average household size was 3.11 and the average family size was 3.55.

In the town, the population was spread out, with 30.6% under the age of 18, 11.7% from 18 to 24, 28.7% from 25 to 44, 18.0% from 45 to 64, and 11.0% who were 65 years of age or older. The median age was 31 years. For every 100 females, there were 86.3 males. For every 100 females age 18 and over, there were 72.3 males.

The median income for a household in the town was $27,500, and the median income for a family was $30,139. Males had a median income of $23,750 versus $16,042 for females. The per capita income for the town was $11,569. 24.7% of the population and 23.1% of families were below the poverty line. Out of the total population, 37.5% of those under the age of 18 and 20.0% of those 65 and older were living below the poverty line.

Education 
The Town of Sledge is served by the Quitman County School District.

Notable people 
 Kate Campbell, musician
 Charley Pride, country singer, born in Sledge. 
 Mack Pride, baseball player, later a minister, born in Sledge.

References

Towns in Mississippi
Towns in Quitman County, Mississippi